Wachendorf may refer to:

Locations
 Wachendorf (Syke), a village in Lower Saxony, Germany
 Wachendorf (Cadolzburg), a village in county of Fürth, Bavaria, Germany 
 Wachendorf (Mechernich), a village in the county of Euskirchen, North Rhine-Westphalia, Germany
 Wachendorf (Starzach), a village in the county of Tübingen, Baden-Württemberg, Germany

People
 Hans Hartmann von Ow-Wachendorf (1882–1966), German lawyer, diplomat and Majoratsherr
 Horst Wachendorf (born 1935), German geologist
 Miles B. Wachendorf, a retired American admiral
 Wilhelm Wachendorf (1877–1949), German businessman